Donald Charles Head (born June 30, 1933) is a Canadian former professional ice hockey player. He played 38 games in the National Hockey League with the Boston Bruins during the 1961–62 season. The rest of his career, which lasted from 1953 to 1971, was spent in the senior Ontario Hockey Association and the Western Hockey League. Head also played for the Canadian national team at the 1960 Winter Olympics, winning a silver medal.

Playing career

Amateur career
Head, a goaltender, played junior hockey for the Toronto Marlboros where he won the Dave Pinkney Trophy for outstanding goaltender in the 1952-53 season. He was the goalie for the Canadian ice hockey team at the 1960 Winter Olympics in Squaw Valley, California, which was expected to take home the gold medals, but settled for silver behind the United States.

Professional career
Following the Olympics, Head signed with the expansion Portland Buckaroos of the Western Hockey League. The Buckaroos would go on to win the league championship, and Head was named to the league all-star team, and was chosen the league's rookie of the year and outstanding goalkeeper. He was among the very few goalies who did not wear a helmet in a game.

The next year, Head was called up to the NHL Boston Bruins, but did not fare as well, winning only 9 of the 38 games he played as the Bruins finished last in the league. He returned to the WHL and won two more outstanding goalkeeper awards with the Buckaroos and was named to two more all-star teams. He also played for the Seattle Totems before ending his career with the Buckaroos in 1975, the same year the franchise folded.

Legacy
Head was named to the Oregon Sports Hall of Fame in 1993.

Career statistics

Regular season and playoffs

International

References

External links
 

1933 births
Living people
Boston Bruins players
Canadian ice hockey goaltenders
Ice hockey players at the 1960 Winter Olympics
Medalists at the 1960 Winter Olympics
Olympic ice hockey players of Canada
Olympic medalists in ice hockey
Olympic silver medalists for Canada
Ontario Hockey Association Senior A League (1890–1979) players
People from York, Toronto
Portland Buckaroos players
Seattle Totems (WHL) players
Ice hockey people from Toronto
Toronto Marlboros players
Windsor Bulldogs (OHA) players